Mary Oliver (1935–2019) was an American poet.

Mary Oliver may also refer to::
Mary Oliver (violinist), American violinist
Mary Beth Oliver, professor of media studies at Penn State University
Mary Margaret Oliver, American politician and member of the Georgia House of Representatives

See also
Mary C. Wright (née Mary Oliver Clabaugh, 1917–1970), American sinologist and historian